The 2020–21 season is Unione Sportiva Lecce's first season back in Serie B since being promoted at the end of the 2017–18 Serie C season. During this season the club are competing in the Serie B and the Coppa Italia.

Players

Current squad
.

Out on loan

Transfers

Pre-season and friendlies

Competitions

Serie B

League table

Results summary

Results by round

Matches

Coppa Italia

References

External links
Official website 

U.S. Lecce seasons
Lecce